Dali City is the county-level seat of the Dali Bai Autonomous Prefecture in northwestern Yunnan. Dali City is administered through 12 township-level districts, two of which are also commonly referred to as Dali.

Xiaguan formerly transliterated as Hsia-kuan, is the modern city centre and usually conflated with Dali City by virtue of being its seat. This town is the destination of most long-distance transportation heading to Dali and is sometimes referred to as Dali New Town to avoid confusion.

This town, commonly referred to as Dali Old Town to distinguish it from the city seat in Xiaguan, is usually the Dali referred to in tourist publications. The old town is one of the most popular tourist destinations in Yunnan, known for its natural scenery, historical and cultural heritage, and vibrant nightlife.

Geography

Dali is situated in the transition area between the dramatic valleys of the eastern Tibetan Plateau and the distinctive mountains of the western Yungui Plateau. The county-level city surrounds Erhai Lake between the Cang Mountains to the west and Mount Jizu to the east. The county seat at Xiaguan is located at the outlet of the lake into the Yangbi River. Dali Old Town is situated on a fertile plain between the Cang Range and Erhai. This plain has traditionally been settled by the Bai and Yi minorities.

Climate
Its low latitude tempered by its high elevation, Dali has a mild subtropical highland climate (Köppen Cwb) with short, mild, dry winters and warm, rainy summers. A great majority of the year's rainfall occurs from June to October. December 2013 was particularly marked for its high snowfall.

Administrative divisions

Dali City has 3 subdistricts, 9 towns and 1 ethnic township. 
3 subdistricts
 Xiaguan
 Taihe
 Manjiang
9 towns

1 ethnic township
Taiyi Yi Ethnic Township
Former  Qiliqiao Town

History

The Dali area was formerly known as Xiemie. The old town was the medieval capital of both the Bai kingdom Nanzhao (779-902) and the Kingdom of Dali (937–1253). That city was razed and its records burnt during its conquest by China's Mongolian Yuan Dynasty. The present old town was organized in the late 14th century under the Hongwu Emperor of the Ming Dynasty. The area became significantly Muslim (Hui) under the Yuan and Ming and was the center of the Panthay Rebellion against the Qing from 1856–1863. It was severely damaged during a massive earthquake in 1925.

Rail and then air transport have permitted the area (particularly Dali Old Town) to become accessible to tourists in the 20th century. It is now one of China's official tourist cities and, along with nearby Lijiang, one of the most popular towns. In order to preserve the appeal of the old town, industrial development is restricted to newer townships such as Xiaguan. Building codes mandate that new construction in the old town and surrounding countryside must conform to the traditional Chinese style, with tiled roofs and bricks, plaster, or white-washed walls.

Economy
Much of the local economy now revolves around tourism and services catering to travelers.

Historically, Dali was able to control some of the trade between India and China and independently famed for the woodworkers of the town of Xizhou and for its high-quality marble, used both for construction and decorative objects. It was so prominent in the latter that the modern Chinese word for marble is literally "Dali stone".

There is also local tea.

Culture
 Third Month Fair (Sanyue Jie)

Transportation

Local transport
Local transport includes buses, taxis, bicycles, and boats on Erhai Lake. Local busses 4 & 8 provide service from Xiaguan to the old town (1 hr). Tourists often rent bicycles from one of the many rental stores in the old town and explore the region by bike, for instance on a special bike trail around the Erhai lake.

Air
Taxis run about 60 RMB to Xiaguan or 90 RMB to the old town. It services (as of 2014) Kunming (20 min), Xishuangbanna (25 min), Chongqing (70 min), Chengdu (80 min), Shanghai, Beijing, Shenzhen, Guangzhou, and Guiyuan.

Road
Dali (i.e., Xiaguan) is connected to Kunming and points east by the Hangrui Expressway (G56), which also runs west to Ruili on the Burmese border. The Dali Expressway (G56₁₁) is a spur connecting it with Lijiang. The road to the old town is China National Highway 214, which connects to the expressway to Lijiang north of the lake. It also runs south from Xiaguan to Menghai near the Burmese border.

Long-distance busses run from the old town's west gate to Kunming (about 4½ hrs), Lijiang, and Shangri-La. Every Monday, service is also available to Shaping for its market.

Long-distance busses run from Xiaguan's stations on Jianshe Road.

Rail
Dali has its own railway station with daily services to Kunming and Lijiang. Service to Kunming used to consist of one train during the day and two trains running overnight, with sleeper cars. Per July 2018 Dali is connected to Kunming with a modern high-speed train link with a frequency of one train per hour. As the railway network expands in Yunnan, train service will become available to Shangri-La County and Ruili in the future.

Tourism

Dali is one of Yunnan's most popular tourist destinations. Sights include:

 Dali Municipal Museum: This centrally located museum houses permanent exhibitions on archaeological findings from the region, on paintings and on Buddhist sculptures.
 Three Pagodas and Chongsheng Temple
 Demi-Gods and Semi-Devils film city
 Xizhou: a historical town famed for its architecture and woodwork
 Shuang lang: on the east side of the lake, once a small fishing village, now a rather high-class tourist destination, most buildings and businesses having overtaken the village since 2012. The coast is now completely built up by tourism estates.
 Cang Mountain, west of the Old City and the Three Pagodas
 Stele in memory of Kublai Khan's conquest of Yunnan, erected on top of a large stone tortoise in Sanyue Lane at the foot of the Cang Mountain, west of the Old City.

Notable people
 Elizabeth Ho（何美倫）- Singer/Songwriter
 Jerry Ho （何兆燊）- Actor/Model, Activist (Featured in Ariana Grandes "thank u, next")

Notes

References

External links

Dali City Official Website
Dali News and Information Network
Shirley & Spinoza Radio

County-level divisions of Dali Bai Autonomous Prefecture
Tourism in Yunnan
Cities in Yunnan